James "Jim" Martinez (born 1958) is an American wrestler. He was born in Osseo, Minnesota. He was the Olympic bronze medalist in Greco-Roman wrestling in 1984.  He also won a bronze medal in the 1985 World Championships.

Jim wrestled for the University of Minnesota, where he was a Big Ten Champion and NCAA Division I All-American.

From 2009 to 2019, he was the head coach of Corona del Sol High School wrestling team, where he won two state championships in 2010 and 2017. As a head coach, the Corona wrestling team consistently finished in the top 10 teams in the state every year.  He resigned in 2019.

On October 18, 2014, Martinez was inducted into the Alan and Gloria Rice Hall of Champions as part of the National Wrestling Hall of Fame and Museum.

References

External links
 

1958 births
Living people
Sportspeople from Minnesota
Wrestlers at the 1984 Summer Olympics
American male sport wrestlers
Olympic bronze medalists for the United States in wrestling
Medalists at the 1984 Summer Olympics
People from Osseo, Minnesota
Minnesota Golden Gophers wrestlers
Pan American Games medalists in wrestling
Pan American Games silver medalists for the United States
Pan American Games bronze medalists for the United States
Wrestlers at the 1983 Pan American Games
Wrestlers at the 1987 Pan American Games
World Wrestling Championships medalists
20th-century American people
21st-century American people